The Journal of Human Evolution is a monthly peer-reviewed scientific journal that concentrates on publishing the highest quality papers covering all aspects of human evolution. JHE was established in 1972 and is published by Elsevier. The Editors-in-Chief are Andrea B. Taylor (Touro University California, USA) and Clément Zanolli (University of Bordeaux, France). The central focus of JHE is aimed jointly at paleoanthropological work, covering human and primate fossils, and at comparative studies of living species, including both morphological and molecular evidence. These include descriptions of new discoveries, analyses and interpretations of new and previously described material, and assessments of the phylogeny and paleobiology of primate species. In addition to original research papers, space is allocated for the rapid publication of short communications on new discoveries, such as exciting new fossils, as well as lead book reviews, obituaries and review papers of exceptionally high quality.

The journal received a 2020 impact factor of 3.895, up from 3.534 in 2019.

Abstracting and indexing
The journal is abstracted and indexed in:

See also
List of Elsevier periodicals
List of anthropology journals

References

External links

Evolutionary biology journals
Anthropology journals
Elsevier academic journals
Monthly journals
Publications established in 1972
English-language journals